The Abdelhamid Ben Badis Mosque was inaugurated in Oran, Algeria in 2015.

Context
Abdelhamid Ben Badis is a revered figure among Algerian Muslims. In 1931, Ben Badis helped found the Association of Algerian Muslim Ulema, an Islamic reformist organization that helped combat assimilation into colonial French culture.

History
Plans for construction of the Mosque began in 1975. However, the site for the planned mosque moved four times in 25 years, before construction began in the year 2000. The construction process was marred with allegations of corruption, with construction stopping twice due to budget overruns. Three different companies were responsible for the construction during that time; an Algerian company, a Chinese company and later a Turkish company would complete the project. At its completion, the project cost an estimated $8.5 billion Algerian dinars, well over the allocated budget of $5 billion dinars.

Since its opening, the Mosque has become a meeting place for high-level figures. Minister of Religious Affairs and Waqf Mohammed Aissa spoke there in 2018 about promoting peace and tolerance within Islam. When Papal envoy Cardinal Giovanni Angelo Becciu visited Algeria for the beatification of the Martyrs of Algeria and the reopening of the Chapel at Fort Santa Cruz, he met with Minister Aissa and Sheikh Mohamed Bendjaber, Imam of the Mosque.

References

2015 establishments in Algeria
Mosques completed in 2015
Mosques in Oran
Sunni mosques
Sunni Islam in Algeria
21st-century religious buildings and structures in Algeria